Morten Andersen is a Danish model and fashion photographer. He worked as a European model for Hugo Boss and Giorgio Armani, and in several international campaigns, In the late 1980s Andersen began his new career as a photojournalist.. His published work includes 'Fast City' (1999); 'TOKYO 20002002' (2016); and 'Fast Cities' (2018).

References

20th-century Danish photographers
21st-century Danish photographers
Danish photographers
Living people
Year of birth missing (living people)